Chlebnice is a village and municipality in Dolný Kubín District in the Žilina Region of northern Slovakia.

Chlebnice has three sister cities: Balkány in Hungary, Słopnice in Poland and Lázári in Romania.

See also
 List of municipalities and towns in Slovakia

References

Genealogical resources

The records for genealogical research are available at the state archive "Statny Archiv in  Bytca, Slovakia"

 Roman Catholic church records (births/marriages/deaths): 1672-1909 (parish A)

External links
Surnames of living people in Chlebnice

Villages and municipalities in Dolný Kubín District